3net was an American 3D television channel that launched on February 13, 2011. It was a joint venture between Discovery Communications, Sony and IMAX Corporation. The partnership was announced in June 2010, and the channel was previewed publicly at the 2011 Consumer Electronics Show.

Carriage
DirecTV carried the channel exclusively since launch.
Nintendo's 3DS handheld system frequently provided episodic clips of content from 3net's programs on their Nintendo Video service. On August 12, 2014, 3net ceased broadcasting to all providers and was dropped from the DirecTV channel lineup.

Programming
The channel had several original shows as well as theatrical films.

Original shows
Building the Brand
Son of a Pitch
Experience 3D
In The Qube 3D
Wildebeest Migration
Bullproof
African Wild
Attack of the Giant Jellyfish
China Revealed
Ghost Lab
Dream Defenders
High Octane
Jewels of the World
Making the Brand
2011 3D Creative Arts Awards: Your World in 3D
3D Safari: Africa
Space: Unraveling the Cosmos
Scary Tales

Repeats of the 3net series African Wild and Building the Brand are currently airing on the digital broadcast network Quest.

References

External links

3D television channels
Warner Bros. Discovery networks
Sony
Sony Pictures Television
IMAX
Defunct television networks in the United States
Television channels and stations established in 2011
Television channels and stations disestablished in 2014
English-language television stations in the United States